Lemus is a surname that originated in Spain and may refer to:

People 
Ángel Lemus
Carlos Lemus
Daniel Santomé Lemus
Gabriela Lemus
José María Lemus
Juan Carlos Lemus
Silvia Lemus

See also
Lemu (disambiguation)